Culleendarragh is a townland in County Westmeath, Ireland.

Culleendarragh is one of 15 townlands of the civil parish of Leny in the barony of Corkaree in the Province of Leinster. The neighbouring townlands are: Ballindurrow to the north, Culleenabohoge to the east, Ballynafid and Knightswood to the south and Heathland to the west.

In the 1911 census of Ireland there were 4 houses and 17 inhabitants in the townland.

References

External links
Culleendarragh at the IreAtlas Townland Data Base
Culleendarragh at Townlands.ie
Culleendarragh at Logainm.ie

Townlands of County Westmeath